Atlantic and Pacific Railroad may refer to:
Atlantic and Pacific Railroad, incorporated by the U.S. Congress in 1866 to connect Springfield, Missouri with the Pacific; consisted of two separate lines in the Southwestern and Midwestern U.S.
The general idea of a transcontinental railroad in the Americas
Atlantic and Pacific Railroad (Illinois), 1865–1872, predecessor of the Milwaukee Road
Atlantic and Pacific Railroad (Texas), incorporated by the New York state legislature in 1853; eventually became the Texas and Pacific Railway